Arthur Greig Kay was a New Zealand rugby league footballer who represented New Zealand.

Kay represented Auckland and was first selected to play for New Zealand in 1935. He played in all three test matches against the touring Australian side.

In 1936 he played in two matches against the touring Great Britain team and played in his final test match in New Zealand's 16-15 victory over Australia at Carlaw Park on 14 August 1937. He was selected to tour Great Britain and France in 1939 but the tour was abandoned due to the outbreak of World War II.

In 1944 Kay coached the Ponsonby side but midseason due to the team struggling somewhat he came out of retirement and was a key part of them winning the majority of their remaining games including 3 Roope Rooster matches to claim the knockout trophy before a loss to City in the Stormont Shield championship match.

In 1951 Kay coached the Point Chevalier senior side. They finished the championship with a 6 win, 8 loss record but then in the Roope Rooster they beat Richmond 9-8, Ponsonby 12-3, and Northcote in the final 8-6. Then 2 weeks later they defeated Richmond 18-13 to win the Stormont Shield. This fortnight gave Point Chevalier their first two major titles in Auckland Rugby League.

References

Year of birth missing
Year of death missing
New Zealand rugby league players
New Zealand national rugby league team players
Auckland rugby league team players
Ponsonby Ponies players
Rugby league centres
Rugby league five-eighths